Quality Hill Historic District is a national historic district located at Clarksburg, Harrison County, West Virginia.  The district encompasses 33 contributing buildings in the East Main Street and Jackson Square areas.  They are mostly residential buildings date from 1880 to 1910.  The oldest dates from about 1850, the Burton Despard house.  They reflect a variety of popular architectural styles from the late-19th and early-20th centuries.  Notable buildings include the Maxwell-Duncan House (c. 1872), Virgil Highland House (1903-1905), and Robinson-Haynes House/American Red Cross (1895-1897).

It was listed on the National Register of Historic Places in 1985.

References

Houses on the National Register of Historic Places in West Virginia
Historic districts in Harrison County, West Virginia
National Register of Historic Places in Harrison County, West Virginia
American Craftsman architecture in West Virginia
Bungalow architecture in West Virginia
Victorian architecture in West Virginia
Houses in Harrison County, West Virginia
Historic districts on the National Register of Historic Places in West Virginia
Buildings and structures in Clarksburg, West Virginia